The Norway women's junior national handball team is the national under-19 handball team of Norway. Controlled by the Norwegian Handball Federation it represents the country in international matches.

History

World Championship
 Champions   Runners up   Third place   Fourth place

European Championship
 Champions   Runners up   Third place   Fourth place

References

External links

Women's national junior handball teams
Women's handball in Norway
Handball